John Napoleon Brinton Hewitt (December 16, 1859 – October 14, 1937) was a linguist and ethnographer who specialized in Iroquoian and other Native American languages.
Hewitt was born on the Tuscarora Indian Reservation near Lewiston, New York. His parents were Harriet and David; his mother was of Tuscarora, French, Oneida, and Scottish descent, his father of English and Scottish, but raised in a Tuscarora family. His parents raised him speaking the English language, but when he left the reservation to attend schools in Wilson and Lockport, he learned to speak the Tuscarora language from other students who spoke the language.

In 1880, he was hired by Erminnie A. Smith of the Smithsonian Institution's Bureau of Ethnology (now the Bureau of American Ethnology), as an assistant ethnologist. He worked with Smith for several years until her death in 1886. He then applied to the institution for employment to complete the Tuscarora-English dictionary he had begun with Smith. He moved to Washington, D.C., where he would work as an ethnologist until his death in 1937. He worked on the dictionary throughout his life, but it was not published during his lifetime. (It was later edited and published as the Tuscarora-English/English-Tuscarora dictionary.)

In 1914 he was awarded the Cornplanter Medal.

Hewitt's prolific researches, including studies of Iroquois mythology and language, were compiled in his well-known "Iroquois Cosmology" which was published in two parts, 1903 and 1928.

Sources
"Native American/Indian Orators, Storytellers, writers, and historians of New York State"

References

External links
 

1859 births
1937 deaths
Linguists from the United States
American ethnographers
Tuscarora people
Members of the Society of American Indians
Native American linguists
People from Lewiston, New York
Linguists of Siouan languages
19th-century linguists
20th-century linguists